Neville John Laurence Heffernan (12 July 1908 – 6 February 1973) was an Australian rules footballer who played with North Melbourne in the Victorian Football League (VFL), with Preston in the Victorian Football Association (VFA), and who officiated in 67 matches as a VFL boundary umpire.

Family
The son of John Edward Heffernan (1880-1955), and Harriet Heffernan (1888-1954), née Trevaskis, Neville John Laurence Heffernan was born at Hotham, Victoria on 12 July 1908.

He married Matilda Jane Howser (1909-1980) in 1933.

Death
He died (suddenly) at West Footscray, Victoria on 6 February 1973.

Notes

References
 
 Taxi-Men Train, The Sporting Globe, (Saturday, 19 April 1930), p.6.
 Association Clearances, The Argus, (Thursday, 3 July 1930), p.13.
 de Lacy, H.A., "Again a Reshuffle: Top and Bottom Association Teams Fight for Places: Preston's Defence", The Sporting Globe, (Wednesday, 13 August 1930), p.9.
 Football: Wednesday League: Yellow Cabs Wins Grand Final, The Argus, (Thursday, 11 September 1930), p.11.

External links 
 
 
 Neville Heffernan at The VFA Project.

1908 births
1973 deaths
Australian rules footballers from Melbourne
North Melbourne Football Club players
Preston Football Club (VFA) players
Australian Football League umpires
People from North Melbourne